Annika Lee-Jones (born 31 October 1996) is an Australian netball player in the Suncorp Super Netball league, playing for the Sunshine Coast Lightning.

Lee-Jones debuted in the inaugural season (2017) of Super Netball at the West Coast Fever, the home team of her city of birth, Perth. As an underage netballer she represented Western Australia at the under 20 National Netball Championships and was also named in the Australian team for the 2017 Netball World Youth Cup. In her two years at the Fever, Lee-Jones made only four appearances for the club, before moving to the Lightning ahead of the 2019 season. Jones is a defensive player and was brought to the Lightning in the hope of being a suitable replacement for former award-winning goal defender Geva Mentor. She signed a contract extension with the Lightning, keeping her at the club until the end of the 2020 season.

References

External links
 Sunshine Coast Lightning profile
 Suncorp Super Netball profile
 Netball Draft Central profile

1996 births
Australian netball players
West Coast Fever players
Sunshine Coast Lightning players
Living people
Suncorp Super Netball players
Territory Storm players
Western Sting players
Australian Netball League players
Netball players from Western Australia
West Australian Netball League players
Queensland state netball league players